Hugh Howard Sanders  was an American actor, probably best known for playing the role of Dr. Reynolds in the movie To Kill a Mockingbird.

Biography
Born in Illinois, Sanders graduated from Northwestern University's Medill School of Journalism.

He worked in radio until 1949 and then made the transition to Hollywood. He was a guest star in several series, including The Lone Ranger, Highway Patrol, Four Star Playhouse, Playhouse 90, Alfred Hitchcock Presents, Maverick,  Richard Diamond, Private Detective, Zane Grey Theater, Bat Masterson, The Many Loves of Dobie Gillis, The Asphalt Jungle, and Straightaway.  He also made five guest appearances on Perry Mason, including two roles as murder victims: John Callender in "The Case of the Fan Dancer's Horse" (1957), and Ken Bascombe in "The Case of the Bashful Burro" (1960). He also had eight appearances on Rawhide, four on Bonanza, and four on The Fugitive.

Sanders was married to Dorothy Allsup of Dayton, Ohio.

Sanders is interred at Mountain View Cemetery and Mausoleum in Altadena, California.

Filmography 

1949: Undertow - Dice Table Bettor (uncredited)
1950: The Great Rupert - Mulligan
1950: The Damned Don't Cry - Grady
1950: Mister 880 - Thad Mitchell
1950: Mrs. O'Malley and Mr. Malone - Mr. Askenfelder (uncredited)
1950: The Magnificent Yankee - Parker, Secretary (uncredited)
1951: Storm Warning - Charlie Barr
1951: Sugarfoot - Asa Goodhue
1951: Three Guys Named Mike - Mr. Wiliams
1951: Only the Valiant - Capt. Eversham
1951: I Was a Communist for the FBI - Clyde Garson
1951: The Travelers - Frank Newcombe
1951: That's My Boy - Coach Wheeler
1951: Strictly Dishonorable - Harry Donnelly
1951: Tomorrow Is Another Day - Detective Lt. George Conover
1951: Flying Leathernecks - General on Guadalcanal (uncredited)
1951: Cave of Outlaws - Sheriff
1952: Indian Uprising - Ben Alsop
1952: Boots Malone - Matson
1952: The Fighter - Roberts
1952: The Pride of St. Louis - Horst
1952: The Sellout - Judge Neeler
1952: Montana Territory - Jason Waterman
1952: The Winning Team - Joe McCarthy
1952: Something for the Birds - Jim Grady
1952: The Steel Trap - Mr. Greer, Passport clerk
1953: Last of the Comanches - Denver Kinnaird
1953: The Blue Gardenia - 'Chronicle' Managing Editor (uncredited)
1953: Scared Stiff - Cop on Pier
1953: Gun Belt - Douglas Frazer
1953: Here Come the Girls - Captain (uncredited)
1953: City of Bad Men - Sheriff Bill Gifford
1953: Thunder Over the Plains - H.L. Balfour
1953: The Glass Web - Police Lt. Mike Stevens
1953: The Wild One - Charlie Thomas
1953-1955: The Lone Ranger (TV Series) - Deputy Waters / Gill Canby / Matthew Block / Clyde Norton / Sheriff Burley / Frank Ferris
1954: Untamed Heiress - Williams
1954: Silver Lode - Reverend Field
1954: Shield for Murder - Packy Reed
1955: I Cover the Underworld - Tim Donovan
1955: 5 Against the House - Pat Winters (uncredited)
1955: Finger Man - Mr. Burns
1955: Chicago Syndicate - Pat Winters
1955: The Last Command - Sam Houston
1955: I Died a Thousand Times - Mr. Baughman (uncredited)
1955: Top Gun - Ed Marsh
1955-1956: The Star and the Story (TV Series) - Mr. Beavers / Capt. Sommers / Dr. Franklin Crane / Lt. Hendricks
1956: Glory - Sobbing Sam Cooney
1956: Miami Exposé - Chief Charles Landon
1956: The Peacemaker - Lathe Sawyer
1957: Chain of Evidence (1957) - Morton Ramsey (uncredited)
1957: The Phantom Stagecoach - Martin Maroon
1957: The Guns of Fort Petticoat - Sgt. Webber (uncredited)
1957: The Careless Years - Uncle Harry
1957: Jailhouse Rock - Prison Warden (uncredited)
1958: Going Steady - Mr. Ahern
1958: Life Begins at 17 - Harry Peck
1958: Voice in the Mirror - A.W. Hornsby
1959: Judgment Night (The Twilight Zone) - Jerry Potter
1959: Never Steal Anything Small - Union Spokesman (uncredited)
1959: Warlock - Sheriff Keller (uncredited)
1959: Don't Give Up the Ship - Adm. Rogers
1959: The Big Operator - Sen. Leland (uncredited)
1960: Cage of Evil - Martin Bender, Fence
1960: Shadow of the Boomerang
1960: The Music Box Kid - Stanley Sandman (Chesty's lawyer) (uncredited)
1961: Man-Trap - E.J. Malden
1962: The Real McCoys - Mr. Merken
1962: The Wild Westerners - Chief Marshal Reuben Bernard
1962: Panic in Year Zero! - Evacuee from Chatsworth (uncredited)
1962: To Kill a Mockingbird - Dr. Reynolds (uncredited)
1964: Mister Ed - Sergeant Myers (Episode: The Prowler)
1964: Apache Rifles - Arizona Delegate
1965: Harum Scarum - U.S. Ambassador McCord (uncredited)
1965: The Fugitive, A.P.B. Sheriff
1966: Incident at Phantom Hill - Regan's Party Guest (uncredited)
1966: The Oscar'' - Mr. Cole (uncredited) (final film role)

References

External links 

1911 births
1966 deaths
American male film actors
American male television actors
20th-century American male actors
Burials in California